The Abu Dhabi Investment Authority (ADIA) is a sovereign wealth fund owned by the Emirate of Abu Dhabi (in the United Arab Emirates) founded for the purpose of investing funds on behalf of the Government of the Emirate of Abu Dhabi. It manages the Emirate's excess oil reserves and is estimated to manage $790 billion.

ADIA's operations have been characterized as secretive and opaque.

History
In 1967, Abu Dhabi emirate created the Financial Investments Board which operated within its Department of Finance and was responsible for managing the Emirate's excess oil revenues. However, in 1976, Sheikh Zayed bin Sultan Al Nahyan, the founding president of the United Arab Emirates, converted it into the Abu Dhabi Investment Authority. The goal was to invest the Abu Dhabi government's surpluses across various asset classes, with low risk. At the time it was novel for a government to invest its reserves in anything other than gold or short-term credit. Even today, investment in short-term paper remains the strategy for the vast majority of countries.

In the Bank of Credit and Commerce International scandal of the 1990s, ADIA reportedly lost hundreds of millions of dollars.

The operations of ADIA have historically and to the present been secretive and opaque.

The fund is a member of the International Forum of Sovereign Wealth Funds.

Strategy
ADIA manages a substantial amount of capital, and is one of the world's largest investment funds. Due to its size, the fund has been influential in international finance. In 2008, ADIA co-chaired the International Working Group of 26 sovereign wealth funds that produced the "Generally Accepted Principles and Practices of sovereign wealth funds" (known as the Santiago Principles). These principles were created to demonstrate to home and recipient countries and the international financial markets that sovereign wealth funds had robust internal frameworks and governance practices and that their investments were made only on an economic and financial basis.

20 year and 30 year annualized rates of return for the ADIA portfolio were 7.6% and 8.1%, respectively, as of 31 December 2010. ADIA is one of the largest sovereign wealth funds in the world.

Today ADIA invests in all the international markets — equities, fixed income and treasury, infrastructure, real estate, private equity and alternatives (hedge funds and commodity trading advisers — CTAs). ADIA's global portfolio is broken down into sub-funds covering a specific asset class. Each asset class has its own fund managers and in-house analysts covering it. Almost every asset class is managed both internally and externally. Overall between 70% and 80% of the organization's assets are managed outside, and over the last few years the fund has become more indexed which given its unique asset liability structure is somewhat perplexing. The Abu Dhabi Investment Authority (ADIA) is a major purchaser of U.S. institutional real estate through various sub-entities. It often buys partial interest ownerships with leading real estate managers. ADIA also invests in development projects including malls.

Many of ADIA's investments have decreased substantially since investments were made at market peaks in 2007 and 2008. The $7 billion investment in Citigroup has lost approximately 90% of its value as of 26 November 2009, 2 years after it acquired a sizable stake in the bank. Its investments in global real-estate at the market top in 2008 have also decreased substantially in value. Though it talks of its long term success in generating returns, the fact that it has moved closer to the index and manages most of its funds through external third party fund managers shows that its tolerance for risk taking is greatly diminished over the years. However, ADIA's ratio of third-party fund managers is being actively managed. In 2006, between 70% and 80% of the organization's assets were managed outside with an aim to bring that down to between 60% and 70%. In the year 2005, Abu Dhabi Investment Company purchased 51 percent of shares of Massar (Company) from Abu Dhabi Power Corporation, a subsidiary of Abu Dhabi Water & Electricity Authority.

On 27 May 2013, ADIA published its 2012 Review, with an overview of its activities during the past year as well as an explanation of its approach to investing – strategy, governance and risk management.

Board of directors
The board members currently serve for a period of three years, and can be renewed. They are appointed by Emiri decree. The current board dates back to the April 2010 reshuffle (Emiri decree n°4/2010) and it was fully renewed April 2013.

 Sultan bin Zayed Al Nahyan, Representative of His Highness the President of the State (UAE)
 Mohammed bin Zayed Al Nahyan Chairman, (Current Ruler of Abu Dhabi, Supreme Commander-in-chief of the UAE Armed Forces and President of the UAE)
 Mansour bin Zayed Al Nahyan, Deputy Prime Minister and Minister of Presidential Affairs (UAE)
 Hamed bin Zayed Al Nahyan, Managing Director, (replacing his deceased brother Ahmed bin Zayed Al Nahyan)
 Mohammed bin Khalifa bin Zayed Al Nahyan, Member of the Executive Council (Abu Dhabi)
 Mohammed Habroush Al Suwaidi, Head of the Department of Finance (Abu Dhabi)
 Hamad Mohammed Al Hurr Al Suwaidi, Head of the Department of Finance (Abu Dhabi)
 Khalil Mohammed Foulathi

Former important board members include:
Ahmed bin Zayed Al Nahyan (1969–2010), appointed as Managing Director in 1997, while still in his twenties. He died in 2010 and was replaced by his half-brother Sheikh Hamed bin Zayed Al Nahyan. He very much symbolized the growth of the fund during the 1990s and early 2000s.
Dr. Jouan Salem Al Dhaheri (1948–2013), appointed in 1977, one of the oldest officials in Abu Dhabi. He served as Deputy Managing Director, Deputy head of the Investment Committee and Head of the Audit Committee and has symbolized the establishment and the growth of the fund. He died from stroke in 2013.
Khalifa Muhammad Khalifa Al Kindi (born 1959), appointed as Deputy Managing Director in 1997. He served until 2007, when he was dispatched to manage the newly established Abu Dhabi Investment Council (ADIC).
 Ghanim Faris Ghanim Ateish Al Mazrui, former financial advisor to Sheikh Zayed bin Sultan Al Nahyan, and former Chairman of ADIA and former director of the UAE Central Bank.

References

External links
Sovereign Wealth Fund Institute – Abu Dhabi Investment Authority

Economy of the United Arab Emirates
Sovereign wealth funds
Government agencies of Abu Dhabi
Government agencies established in 1976
Emirati companies established in 1976
Financial services companies established in 1976